Turok is a fictional American comic book character.

Turok or Turoc may also refer to:

Arts and entertainment
 Turok (video game series), a series of first-person shooter video games based on the Turok comic book character
 Turok: Dinosaur Hunter, 1997 video game
 Turok: Battle of the Bionosaurs, 1997 video game
 Turok 2: Seeds of Evil, 1998 video game
 Turok: Rage Wars, 1999 video game
 Turok 3: Shadow of Oblivion, 2000 video game
 Turok: Evolution, 2002 video game
 Turok (video game), 2008
 Turok: Son of Stone (film), 2008 film

Places
 Turiec, a region in central Slovakia 
 Turóc County, was an administrative county (comitatus) of the Kingdom of Hungary

Other
 Turok (surname)

See also
 
 Turiec (disambiguation)